Archie L. Clark (born July 15, 1941) is an American former professional basketball player.  At 6'2", he played guard for five National Basketball Association (NBA) teams.

Born in Conway, Arkansas, Clark grew up in the suburbs of Detroit and joined the United States Army after high school.  While playing for an intramural basketball team at Andrews Air Force Base, he was discovered by a scout from University of Minnesota and soon accepted a scholarship to play for John Kundla.  After a strong collegiate career, which included an All Big Ten selection as a senior, he was drafted by the Los Angeles Lakers in the fourth round of the 1966 NBA draft.

In his 10-season (1966–1976) NBA career, Clark played for the Lakers, the Philadelphia 76ers, the Baltimore/Capital Bullets, the Seattle SuperSonics, and the Detroit Pistons.  In 1968, Clark was part of the trade (together with Darrall Imhoff and Jerry Chambers) that brought Wilt Chamberlain to the Lakers.  He averaged 16.3 career points and 4.8 career assists and appeared in two National Basketball Association All-Star Games; he also received All-NBA Second Team honors in 1972.

He was acquired along with a 1973 second-round selection (19th overall–Louie Nelson) and cash by the Baltimore Bullets from the 76ers for Kevin Loughery and Fred Carter on October 17, 1971. He refused to play for the Bullets under the same contract he had in Philadelphia. He rejoined the team nine days after the trade on October 26 while his contract was being renegotiated. He was dealt from the Washington Bullets to the SuperSonics for Dick Gibbs and a 1975 third-round pick (48th overall–Tom Kropp) on August 19, 1974.

Clark was one of the first effective practitioners of the crossover dribble, which inspired his nickname "Shake and Bake."

In 1987, Clark unsuccessfully ran for Mayor of Ecorse, Michigan.  In 1992, he co-founded the National Basketball Retired Players Association with Dave DeBusschere, Dave Bing, Dave Cowens and Oscar Robertson.

References

External links
Career statistics
NBRPA biography

1941 births
Living people
African-American basketball players
Baltimore Bullets (1963–1973) players
Basketball players from Arkansas
Capital Bullets players
Detroit Pistons players
Guards (basketball)
Los Angeles Lakers draft picks
Los Angeles Lakers players
Minnesota Golden Gophers men's basketball players
National Basketball Association All-Stars
People from Conway, Arkansas
Philadelphia 76ers players
Seattle SuperSonics players
American men's basketball players
21st-century African-American people
20th-century African-American sportspeople